The 1914 Great Britain Lions tour of Australia and New Zealand was the second ever British national rugby league team or 'Lions' tour of Australasia, where it was winter and matches were played against the Australian and New Zealand national sides, as well as several local teams. The tour repeated the promotional and financial success of the 1910 Great Britain Lions tour of Australasia and became famous for the third and deciding Ashes test, known as the "Rorke's Drift Test" due to a backs-to-the wall British victory against all odds.

Touring squad 
At the 1913–14 Northern Rugby Football Union season's conclusion, the following Great Britain squad was assembled by the Northern Rugby Football Union to represent it on the tour of Australasia. The Union's tour manager was John Clifford.

Australia 
The first leg of the tour was Australia, where the game of rugby league football was in its seventh year since splitting away from rugby union in 1908. the tourists ventured to Adelaide, Melbourne, Ipswich and Bathurst, as well as Sydney, Brisbane and Newcastle.

The Australian team was captained in all three Ashes Tests by North Sydney skipper Sid Deane.

Test venues 
The three Ashes series tests took place at the following venues. All three tests took place in Sydney.

South Australia: J. Lawson, R. Cooksley, O. Howard, E. Dutton, P. Knowles, W. Oldfield, M. Moran, C. Fincham, J. Sorensen, F. Stewart, J. Carr, A. Shuttleworth, P. Jackson. Res – L. Scott

Northern Union: Alf Wood (c), Jack Robinson, William Davies, Bert Jenkins, Frank Williams, Fred Smith, Jack O'Garra, James Clampitt, Billy Jarman, Arthur Johnson, Dave Holland, Percy Coldrick, John Smales

Metropolis: Howard Hallett, Harold Horder, Sid Deane (c), Bill Kelly, Wally Messenger, Ray Norman, Arthur Halloway, Jack Watkins, Sid Pearce, Con Sullivan, Paddy McCue, Ed Courtney, Frank Burge

Northern Union: Alf Wood, Frank Williams, William Davies (c), Bert Jenkins, Jack Robinson, Stuart Prosser, Johnny Rogers, Joseph Guerin, James Clampitt, Walter Roman, Billy Jarman, Dave Holland, John Smales

NSW: Howard Hallett, Harold Horder, Sid Deane (c), Bill Kelly, Wally Messenger, Ray Norman, Arthur Halloway, Jack Watkins, Sid Pearce, Con Sullivan, Paddy McCue, Ed Courtney, Frank Burge. Res – Charles Fraser

Northern Union: Gwyn Thomas, William Davies, Harold Wagstaff (c), Bert Jenkins, Stan Moorhouse, Billy Hall, Johnny Rogers, Percy Coldrick, Douglas Clark, Arthur Johnson, Billy Jarman, Dave Holland, Jack Chilcott

Queensland: Mick Bolewski (c), Herbert McCabe, Walter Bolewski, Henry Bolewski, William Beavis, Daniel Rowley, Evan Lewis, Jack Egan, Thomas Dean, Harold Bawden, Charles Scott, William Pritchard, James Adams

Northern Union: Gwyn Thomas, Frank Williams, Harold Wagstaff (c), William Davies, Alfred Francis, Fred Smith, Jack O'Garra, Joseph Guerin, Douglas Clark, Fred Longstaff, Dick Ramsdale, John Smales, Jack Chilcott

Northern Union: Billy Jarman, Stan Moorhouse, Harold Wagstaff (c), Billy Hall, Alfred Francis, Stuart Prosser, Fred Smith, Arthur Johnson, Joseph Guerin, James Clampitt, Walter Roman, Percy Coldrick, Fred Longstaff

Queensland: Mick Bolewski (c), Herbert McCabe, John Birkett, Henry Bolewski, William Beavis, Thomas Hennessy, Evan Lewis, Jack Egan, Thomas Dean, Peter Olsen, Charles Scott, William Pritchard, Don Jeffrey

Northern Union: Gwyn Thomas, Frank Williams, Harold Wagstaff (c), Bert Jenkins, Stan Moorhouse, Billy Hall, Johnny Rogers, Percy Coldrick, Douglas Clark, Fred Longstaff, Dick Ramsdale, Billy Jarman, Jack Chilcott

Newcastle: J. Maloney (c), P. Scully, W. Coleman, E. Brien, G. Johns, J. Coleman, F. Bell, F. Grahame, H. Williams, Stan Carpenter, J. Quinn, Arthur Baber, C. Perkins

Northern Union: Alf Wood, Alfred Francis, Harold Wagstaff (c), William Davies, Jack Robinson, Fred Smith, Jack O'Garra, Walter Roman, James Clampitt, Joseph Guerin, Dave Holland, John Smales, Arthur Johnson

First test 
Future Australian Rugby League Hall of Fame inductee Harold Horder was selected to make his Test debut for this match. On the other wing was the only Queenslander selected in the home side, Henry Bolewski. Also selected to debut for his adopted country was New Zealander, Bill Kelly, after whom the trophy contested in the ANZAC Test would be named.

The first test of the 1914 Ashes series was played in Sydney before a crowd of around 40,000. Leeds forward Billy Jarman, making his debut for Great Britain missed a conversion attempt from in front of the posts. Henry Bolewski was the only Queensland player selected in the Australian side.

Second test 

After being humiliated in the first Test, the Australians bounced back to narrowly win the second 12–7 at the Sydney Cricket Ground with Charles Fraser and Frank Burge scoring and Wally Messenger kicking 3 goals.

Western Districts: E. Hawke, A. Bassett, A. Dawson, H. Gunn, E. Lockhard, R. Trefrey, Edward Coyne, D. Gander, Arch Moncreiff (c), D. Reece, P. Smith, R. Murphy, D. Haynes

Northern Union: Alf Wood (c), Frank Williams, Billy Hall, William Davies, Jack O'Garra, Stuart Prosser, Johnny Rogers, Walter Roman, James Clampitt, Joseph Guerin, John Smales, Billy Jarman, Arthur Johnson

Third test 
The third and deciding Ashes test had originally been scheduled for Melbourne in August, but the New South Wales Rugby Football League unilaterally rescheduled it for Sydney on 4 July to maximise profits. Melbourne had to wait another 78 years until they hosted their first test, in the Ashes Series of 1992. The British protested that it would be their third test match in seven days and several of their first team were out with injuries, but the NSWRFL got its way. The tourists were instructed by the Northern Union officials to play and do their duty for England.

Within the first minutes of the match, Great Britain were down a man due to an injury to Frank Williams. Forward Arthur 'Chick' Johnson, the Widnes club's first international representative, was shifted to the wing to take Williams' place. At half time the British were leading 9–3. Ten minutes into the second half, they had lost Douglas Clark and Billy Hall to injuries so were reduced to ten men. 'Chick' Johnson, playing out of position on the wing, then used the unorthodox method of dribbling the ball ahead with his feet to score a try. This lifted his teammates in defence and the British managed to win 14–6.

NSW: George Challis, Tom Leggo, Bob Tidyman, Charles Fraser, George Bain, Les Cubitt, Arthur Halloway (c), Bob Williams, Sid Pearce, Ed Courtney, Bob Craig, Albert Burge, Frank Burge. Res – 

Northern Union: Alf Wood, Stan Moorhouse, Harold Wagstaff (c), Bert Jenkins, William Davies, Billy Hall, Johnny Rogers, Percy Coldrick, James Clampitt, Dick Ramsdale, Fred Longstaff, Jack Chilcott, Arthur Johnson

This game was played on the return leg from New Zealand

New Zealand 

Originally scheduled to take place during the Ashes series, the New Zealand leg was postponed until afterwards.

Northern Union: Gwyn Thomas, Joseph Houghton, Billy Hall, William Davies, Jack O'Garra, Stuart Prosser, Fred Smith, Joseph Guerin, Billy Jarman, Jack Chilcott, John Smales, Walter Roman, James Clampitt

 Auckland: Tom Cross, Charles Woolley, Karl Ifwersen, Edward Fox, Thomas McClymont, Arthur Hardgrave, Charles Webb, Charlie Savory, Joe Bennett, Stan Walters, Bob Mitchell, Harold Hayward, Jim Clark

Northern Union: Alf Wood, Stan Moorhouse, Billy Hall, Bert Jenkins, William Davies, Johnny Rogers, Fred Smith, Dick Ramsdale, Arthur Johnson, Jack Chilcott, Fred Longstaff, Percy Coldrick, Dave Holland

Northern Union defeated Auckland 34–12 in front of 13,000 fans. The gate earned the Auckland Rugby League NZ£650.

Northern Union: Alf Wood, Stan Moorhouse, Harold Wagstaff (c), Bert Jenkins, William Davies, Jack O'Garra, Stuart Prosser, Dick Ramsdale, Joseph Guerin, James Clampitt, Fred Longstaff, Percy Coldrick, Walter Roman

New Zealand lost the sole Test match 13–16. Billy Wilson scored two tries, Vic Banks scored one and Karl Ifwersen kicked two goals.

References 

Great Britain national rugby league team tours
Great Britain Lions tour of Australia and New Zealand
Great Britain Lions tour of Australia and New Zealand
Great Britain Lions tour of Australia and New Zealand
Rugby league tours of Australia
Rugby league tours of New Zealand